Csepel is the 21st district and a neighbourhood in Budapest, Hungary. Csepel officially became part of Budapest on 1 January 1950.

Location 
Csepel is located at the northern end of Csepel Island in the Danube, and covers one-tenth of the island's area. Being on an island, it is the only complete district of Budapest which is neither in Pest nor in Buda. On the western side it is bordered by the Danube, while the Ráckevei-Duna (Ráckeve's Danube) runs along the eastern side. The twenty-first district is bordered by the settlements of Szigetszentmiklós and Lakihegy to the south. It has approximately 85,000 inhabitants.

Transportation 
Csepel is most easily accessed from central Budapest by the H7 Csepel HÉV, a high capacity suburban railway. In addition, it is served by BKK buses 138, 35, 36, 148, 151, and 179. Bridges connect Csepel to southern parts of Pest, Ferencváros and Pesterzsébet, and a ferry links Csepel to Soroksár.

By car Csepel can be reached by crossing the Kvassay Bridge (Kvassay híd), Gubacsi Bridge (Gubacsi híd), the D-14 ferry, or via the M0 motorway.

A separated bike path is also maintained across the Kvassay and Gubacsi Bridges.

Name 
The village and the island were named after the first  of the area, Csepel. The German and Serbo-Croat names are derived from the older Hungarian one.

History 
Csepel Island became the personal domain of Árpád after the migration of Hungarians into Pannonia in the early 10th century. It remained a favourite resort of the Hungarian kings in the Middle Ages. From 1484 onwards Csepel was the wedding present to future Hungarian queens. The Ottoman Turks destroyed the village and the royal manor house in the 16th century. At the end of the 17th century, Serb refugees from Turkish-occupied Serbia settled here. At the beginning of the 18th century Prince Eugene of Savoy, owner of the island, re-established the settlement and populated it with German colonists. It became an independent municipality in 1742. The original village was located in the present-day freeport (Szabadkikötő) area but it was destroyed by the great flood of 1838. The new village was built on higher ground, in present-day Ófalu (Old Village). The town had a population of 9462 according to the 1910 census (the ethnic composition was 84% Hungarian and 18% German). Formerly it was a working-class borough with several factories; there was even a bicycle named Csepel. During the Hungarian Revolution of 1956 in Budapest, Hungarian fighters made their last stand in Csepel. Today, Csepel contains housing estates as well as middle-class garden suburbs. The district is home to the sports club Csepel SC.

Population 

Ethnic groups (2001 census):
 Magyars – 92.4%
 Germans – 0.7%
 Romani – 0.7%
 Others – 0.9%
 No answer – 5.3%

Religions (2001 census):
 Roman Catholic – 41.4%
 Calvinist – 13%
 Greek Catholic – 2.2%
 Lutheran – 1.7%
 Other (Christian) – 1%
 Other (non-Christian) – 0.3%
 Atheists – 25.1%
 No answer, unknown – 15.2%

Landmarks 
Noteworthy sights include the Baroque parish church built in 1770, the Csepel Gallery and Museum of Local History (newly moved to Szent Istvan ut. 230), and the Csepel Collection of Factory History.

List of mayors

Twin towns – sister cities
Csepel is twinned with:
 Băile Tușnad, Romania
 Gănești, Romania
 Kielce, Poland
 Rijeka, Croatia
 Salonta, Romania

 Wołomin, Poland

Gallery

See also 
 Csepel Island

References

External links 

 Official web site
 Aerial photographs of Csepel